William Christie may refer to:

 William Christie (Unitarian) (1748–1823), Scottish Unitarian writer
 William Harvie Christie (1808–1873), Australian army officer and politician
 William Christie (dean of Moray, Ross and Caithness) (1816–1885), Scots Episcopal priest and first dean of the United Diocese
 William Dougal Christie (1816–1874), British Member of Parliament and diplomat
 William J. Christie (1824–1899), Canadian politician and Hudson's Bay Company employee
 William Mellis Christie (1829–1900), Scottish-born cookie company founder in Canada
 William Christie (Conservative politician) (1830–1913), British Member of Parliament for Lewes, 1874–1885
 William Christie (astronomer) (1845–1922), British astronomer
 William Christie (dean of Brechin) (fl. 1882–1931), Scots Episcopal priest and son of the above Dean of Moray
 William Christie (Ulster politician) (1913–2008), British politician
 William Christie (musician) (born 1944), American-born French conductor and harpsichordist